The 2012 Teen Choice Awards ceremony, hosted by Demi Lovato and Kevin McHale, was held on July 22, 2012, at the Gibson Amphitheatre, Universal City, California. The awards celebrated the year's achievements in music, film, television, sports, fashion, comedy, and the Internet, and were voted on by teenage viewers aged 13 through 19. Over 134 million votes were cast.

Taylor Swift had the most individual wins with five, including Choice Female Artist and Female Country Artist. Kristen Stewart obtained three awards, including the "Ultimate Choice" award which she shared with Twilight co-stars Taylor Lautner and Robert Pattinson. Although the actors received most awards, The Twilight Saga: Breaking Dawn – Part 1 won four out of 11 nominations as a whole, including the "Ultimate Choice", bringing the entire series' Teen Choice Award totals to 41. The Hunger Games won seven of its eight nominations, including Choice Book, Sci-Fi/Fantasy Movie, and Sci-Fi/Fantasy Movie Actor, for Josh Hutcherson's work. The Vampire Diaries won six of its eight nominations, including Choice Fantasy/Sci-Fi TV Show, Actor: Fantasy/Sci-Fi TV Show and Male Hottie for its star, Ian Somerhalder. Pretty Little Liars won all five of their nominations, including Choice TV Drama.

Presenters
 Zooey Deschanel and Selena Gomez—presented Choice Comedian
 Shaun White and Dax Shepard—presented Choice TV Show: Sci-Fi/Fantasy
 Hayden Panettiere and Will.i.am—introduced No Doubt
 Troian Bellisario, Ashley Benson, Lucy Hale, Ian Harding and Shay Mitchell–presented Choice Movie Actor: Drama
 Zachary Knighton, Adam Pally and Damon Wayans Jr.—presented Choice Hotties
 Kevin Hart and Nina Dobrev—presented Choice Music Group
 Jordin Sparks, Adam Rodriguez and Paul Wesley—presented Choice Movie: Comedy
 Laura Marano, Vanessa Marano and Stefano—introduced Flo Rida
 Zachary Levi—presented Ultimate Choice
 Victoria Justice and Chris Colfer—presented Acuvue Inspire Award
 Tyler Posey and Lea Michele—presented Choice Female Artist
 Bridgit Mendler and Shane West—introduced Justin Bieber
 Taylor Swift—presented Choice Movie Actor: Sci-Fi/Fantasy
 Justin Kirk and Gordon Ramsay—presented Choice Summer Music Star: Group
 Zoe Saldana and Taylor Lautner—presented Choice Summer Movie Star: Male
 Cat Deeley, Demi Lovato, and Kevin McHale—introduced Carly Rae Jepsen

Performers
 Pauly D (DJ host)
 No Doubt – "Settle Down"
 Flo Rida – "Whistle" and "Wild Ones" with Stayc Reigns
 Justin Bieber – "Boyfriend" and "As Long as You Love Me" with Big Sean
 Carly Rae Jepsen – "Call Me Maybe"

Winners and nominees
Winners are listed first and highlighted in bold text.

Movies

Television

Music

Fashion

Sports

Miscellaneous

Television ratings
The 2012 Teen Choice Awards received a 1.0 rating, a 3 share among viewers aged 18–49 and was watched by 3.02 million viewers.

References

External links
 Official TCA Website

2012
2012 awards in the United States
2012 in American music
2012 in Los Angeles